Dechen Phrodrang. meaning "Palace of Great Bliss". is a Buddhist monastery in Thimphu, Bhutan. It is located to the north of the city.

In 1971 it became a monastic school, called a lobra, and currently it has 450 student monks enrolled in eight-year courses with a staff of 15. The monastery contains a number of important historical Bhutanese artifacts including 12th century paintings monitored by UNESCO and a noted statue of Shabdrung Ngawang Namgyal on the upper floor. In the downstairs  chapel, there is a central Sakyamuni Buddha.

References

Buddhist monasteries in Bhutan
Tibetan Buddhism in Bhutan
Bhutan